Renat Brännvin is a Swedish Brännvin (vodka) with 37.5% alcohol content produced by Vin & Sprit and made from wheat grown in Västergötland in Sweden. In 1877, Lars Olsson Smith launched "Ten-fold purified spirits" or "Absolutely pure spirits" produced in a new distillation boiler at Reimersholme in Stockholm. Since the boiler enabled continuous distillation, the spirit could be purified completely free of fusel and Renat became the first fusel-free spirit in Sweden. It was famous for being purified ten times ("Renat" is the Swedish word for "purified"). The product name "Absolutely pure spirits" was changed to Renat in the 1970s to pave the way for the new product Absolut Vodka which was launched in 1979. Renat is considered to be the Swedish national vodka and has recently regained its popularity and is also subject to international attention due to its victories in the International Wine and Spirit Competition (IWSC) in 2005 and 2006. The bottle have in celebration of its 125th birthday had its design remade by Jan Johansson, known artist at Orrefors Glasbruk. In 2002, the previous bottle from 1954 was replaced with a new one designed by the glass artist Jan Johansson at Orrefors glassworks. At the same time, the label was replaced by a new one designed by Roland Ingemarsson. The bottle is manufactured at Limmared's glassworks. In Systembolaget's catalog, Renat has article number 1.

References

External links 
 International Wine and Spirit Competition (IWSC)
 Vin & Sprit

1877 introductions
Goods manufactured in Sweden
Pernod Ricard brands
Swedish brands
Swedish vodkas